Acts 28 is the twenty-eighth (and also the last) chapter of the Acts of the Apostles in the New Testament of the Christian Bible. It records the journey of Paul from Malta to Italy until finally settled in Rome. The book containing this chapter is anonymous, but early Christian tradition uniformly affirmed that Luke composed this book as well as the Gospel of Luke.

Text
The original text was written in Koine Greek and is divided into 31 verses.

Textual witnesses
Some early manuscripts containing the text of this chapter are:
 Codex Vaticanus (AD 325–350)
 Codex Sinaiticus (330–360)
 Codex Bezae (~400)
 Codex Alexandrinus (400–440)
 Codex Ephraemi Rescriptus (~450; extant verses 1–4)
 Codex Laudianus (~550; extant verses 27–31)

Old Testament references
 :

New Testament references
 : 
 Acts 28:8:

Location

This chapter mentions or alludes to the following places (in order of appearance):
 Malta
 Alexandria
 Syracuse
 Rhegium
 Puteoli
 Rome
 Appii Forum (Forum Appii)
 Three Inns (Tres Tabernae)

Miracle on Malta (28:1–10)
The inhabitants of the island are called barbaroi in Greek (verse 2), the standard
term for non-Greek speakers, because they originally came from Carthage and their native language was Punic. The castaways were brought to a local landowner with the common Roman praenomen, Publius (verse 7), whose Maltese title as 'first man' is attested from ancient inscriptions found in the island.  The healing on Publius's sick father (verse 8) recalls Jesus' healing of Peter's mother-in-law, and as in the gospels, prompting other islanders to come for healing (verse 9), indicating that 'God whom Paul serves (Acts 27:23) is still with him' and that 'the whole shipwreck incident has served to load him with honor' (verse 10).

Verse 6
But they were expecting that he was going to swell up or suddenly drop dead. So after they had waited a long time and had seen nothing unusual happen to him, they changed their minds and said he was a god (theón)."

From the Biblos Interlinear Bible:
{| class="wikitable"
|-
| hoi || de || prosedokōn || auton || mellein || pimprasthai || ē || katapiptein || aphnō || nekron
|-
| οἱ || δὲ || προσεδόκων || αὐτὸν || μέλλειν || πίμπρασθαι || ἢ || καταπίπτειν || ἄφνω || νεκρόν
|-
| - || but || they were expecting || him || to be going || to become inflamed || or || to fall down || suddenly || dead
|-
|}
{| class="wikitable"
|-
| epi || poly || de || autōn || prosdokōntōn || kai || theōrountōn || mēden || atopon || eis || auton || ginomenon
|-
| ἐπὶ || πολὺ || δὲ || αὐτῶν || προσδοκώντων || καὶ || θεωρούντων || μηδὲν || ἄτοπον || εἰς || αὐτὸν || γινόμενον
|-
| after a while || great || however || they || expecting || and || seeing || nothing || amiss || to || him || happening
|-
|}
{| class="wikitable"
|-
| metabalomenoi || elegon || auton || einai || theon
|-
| μεταβαλόμενοι || ἔλεγον || αὐτὸν || εἶναι || θεόν
|-
| having changed their opinion || said || he || was || a god
|-
|}
For comparison, see John 1:1.

The islanders regarded 'Paul's imperviousness to snakebite' as a sign of divine status, which was a common attitude among both Greek-speaking people and 'barbarians' (Greek: barbaroi for "non-Greek speaking people"). Chariton of Aphrodisias in wrote in his historical novel, Callirhoe (mid first century CE, roughly contemporary with Acts), about a pirate, who was saved from shipwreck then claiming the divine intervention.

Verse 8
It happened that the father of Publius lay sick with fever and dysentery. And Paul visited him and prayed, and putting his hands on him, healed him.

"Fever and dysentery": The Pulpit Commentary noted about this verse that "the terms here used are all professional ones".

The Ethiopic version of Acts adds after "Paul went in to him and prayed", "and he entreated him to put his hand upon him" meaning either that Publius asked this favor on behalf of his father, or the Publius' father himself asked this.

Journey from Malta to Rome (28:11–16)
An Alexandrian ship wintered in the island gives weight to the identification of 'Melita' with Malta, on the usual line of sea travel from Alexandria to Italy, while the other suggestion, Meleda was far out of the way. The ship stopped in the ports along the east coast of Sicily and the 'toe' of Italy (verses 12–13), featured prominently in ancient Greek writings of voyages to the area, but thereafter the account prefers the Italian names, such as "Puteoli" instead of the Greek Dicaearchia. In Rome there were already 'brothers' (verse 15; NRSV: 'believers') who came out to provide Paul a ceremonial escort along the Appian Way leading into the city. Verse 16 reminds that Paul was still a prisoner with limited liberty.

Verse 11

After three months we sailed in an Alexandrian ship whose figurehead was the Twin Brothers, which had wintered at the island.
 "Whose figurehead was the Twin Brothers": translated from the Greek phrase    . The word "parasemo", that was attested in an ancient Greek dedicatory inscription, can be translated as "whose sign was" or "marked with the image or figure of". Cyril of Alexandria wrote about the Alexandrian method to decorate each side of the ship prow with figures of deities. "Twin Brothers" or "Dioscuri"  refer to "Castor and Pollux" (King James Version), who were specially honored in the district of Cyrenaica, not far from Alexandria. Horace wrote of them (ca. 23 BCE) as "the children of Leda", and the “brothers of Helen, beaming stars”, because the constellation named after Castor and Pollux stars (Gemini) provides bright starlight for mariners, so they are honored as the protector gods of sailors. In his tale of shipwreck, Lucian of Samosata (second century CE) wrote about the important role of the Dioscuri for the safety of the ships, but Paul does not need other help than from God to get through the storm, so the mention here is purely about on the aspect of decoration.

Paul's reception in Rome (28:17–22)
Significantly, the Jewish community in Rome shows an open-minded attitude (verse 22) with no sign of the animosity which Paul has encountered in Asia Minor (Acts 21:27–28), while Paul called the leaders of the community as 'brothers' (verse 17), and assured them that his appeal to Caesar does not imply any disloyalty to 'my nation' (verse 19), hoping to get them on his side before word arrived from Jerusalem (verse 21). The community saw Paul's teaching as related to the 'sect which is spoken against' (verse 21, cf. Luke 2:34), but they want to decide themselves (verse 22) as Paul preach to them in similar way as in all his trials, using the term 'hope of Israel' (as he said to Agrippa in Acts 26:6–8) to refer the 'waiting for the consolation of Israel' for those in the temple (Luke 2:25–38).

Paul's last words (28:23–31)

Paul's preaching to the local community was not recorded, but can be inferred as a repetition of the arguments presented elsewhere in the book of Acts (verse 23). Some listeners were 'convinced' (verse 24), but the overall state of the community at that time was 'disharmony' (verse 25, from Greek asymphonoi, "disagreed"). Luke's citation in the parable of the sower with). The final two verses of the chapter record Paul's continued witness to 'all who came' (that is, Jews as well as Gentiles, verse 30) over a two-year period with the confidence that the 'proclamation of the gospel will go on into an uncertain future with all boldness and without hindrance' (verse 31).

Verse 28
[Paul said:] "Therefore let it be known to you that the salvation of God has been sent to the Gentiles, and they will hear it!"
There is a repeated pattern: 'Jewish rejection of the gospel leads to an emphasis on Gentile inclusion' (Acts 13:44-47).

Verse 31
The narrative of Acts ends with Paul:
 preaching the kingdom of God and teaching the things which concern the Lord Jesus Christ with all confidence, no one forbidding him.

See also
 Twin Brothers (Dioskouroi)
 Paul the Apostle
 Related Bible parts: Isaiah 6, Matthew 13, Acts 26, Acts 27

References

Sources

External links
 King James Bible - Wikisource
English Translation with Parallel Latin Vulgate
Online Bible at GospelHall.org (ESV, KJV, Darby, American Standard Version, Bible in Basic English)
Multiple bible versions at Bible Gateway (NKJV, NIV, NRSV etc.)

28